Snow's Island is an area of swampy lowlands along the Pee Dee River in Florence County, South Carolina.  The area is historically significant as the headquarters during the American Revolutionary War for forces led by Francis Marion (1732-1795), a South Carolina militia officer who is celebrated as the "Swamp Fox." Employing guerrilla war tactics, Marion significantly contributed to the American war effort by conducting numerous raids on British outposts."  The site was declared a National Historic Landmark in 1974.

Description
Snow's Island is located in a remote and swampy area of Florence County, on private land south of the main channel of the Pee Dee River east of Johnsonville.  The property is not open to the public, but may be visible from the end of Dunham Bluff Road, off U.S. Route 378 on the north side of the river.  The contours of the land have been altered over time due to logging activities that have changed the course of the river, and there are no definitively identified remains associated with the American Revolutionary War period.  The site was in 1780 a plantation, whose exact boundaries have not been identified, and the area has been logged several times and used as a private hunting preserve.

The area's historical significance lies in its four-month occupation by the militia forces of General Francis Marion, who orchestrated guerilla-style attacks on British targets from this base between December 1780 and March 1781.  At that time, British forces dedicated to locating Marion found the camp and destroyed it; Marion and most of his band of several hundred men were not there at the time.  The only known potential artifact associated with the Marion occupation is an earthen formation that may be a military defensive works.

See also
List of National Historic Landmarks in South Carolina
National Register of Historic Places listings in Florence County, South Carolina

References

External links
Snow's Island, Florence County (Address Restricted), at South Carolina Department of Archives and History

National Historic Landmarks in South Carolina
Geography of Florence County, South Carolina
1781 establishments in South Carolina
American Revolutionary War sites
National Register of Historic Places in Florence County, South Carolina